Oldham Cricket Club is a cricket team based at The Pollards in the Watersheddings area of Oldham, Greater Manchester, England.

In 1892 Oldham were one of the founding members of the Central Lancashire League and currently run teams in the First and Second divisions; with junior sides at Under 18 and Under 15 levels.

Their professional for 2007 was Greg Todd of New Zealand, who heralded the end of a long line of South African professionals at the club, including Mark Charlton (2006) and Martin Smith (2004–05).

Honours
First Division: 1909, 1916, 1957, 1979, 1982
Wood Cup: 1943, 1979, 1983, 1985, 1988
Second Division: 1902, 1930, 1944 (shared), 1983, 1985, 1986, 2016
Burton Cup: 1976
Moor Cup: 2017

References

Central Lancashire League cricket clubs
Sport in Oldham
Cricket in Greater Manchester
Organisations based in Oldham